Biernatka   is a village in the administrative district of Gmina Czarne, within Człuchów County, Pomeranian Voivodeship, in northern Poland.

Until 1771 Crown of the Kingdom of Poland, next was part of Kingdom of Prussia (First Partition of Poland). For the history of the region, see History of Pomerania. For details of the history of the region, see History of Pomerania.

The village has a population of 98.

References

Biernatka